Jamie D. Fox (born 11 June 1964 in Woodstock, New Brunswick) is a Canadian politician, who became the interim leader of the Progressive Conservative Party of Prince Edward Island and Opposition leader in the Legislative Assembly on October 15, 2015. Fox was elected to the Legislative Assembly of Prince Edward Island in the 2015 provincial election. He represents the electoral district of Borden-Kinkora. In October 2017, James Alyward was elected as the Leader of the Progressive Conservative Party of PEI after Fox serving for two years as the Interim Leader.

Fox was the Opposition Critic for the  Departments of Transportation, Infrastructure & Energy and Justice & Public Safety from 2015 to 2019.

He has also served on the Infrastructure & Energy Standing Committee, the Agricultural & Fisheries Standing Committee, Public Account's Committee's and currently sits on the Policy &Priorities Committee of Executive Council as the chairman.

He was previously the party's candidate in the same district for the 2011 provincial election, and was an unsuccessful candidate in the party's 2010 leadership election.

Fox has been successful in having three Private Members Bills passed in the Legislature, 2016 Highway Traffic Act Bill improving officer safety, 2017 Workers Compensation Act recognizing PTSD coverage for all workers and 2018 Mandatory Sexual Assault Law Training Act requiring Judges to have sexual assault law education.

In April 2019, Fox was re-elected in the Provincial General election and was appointed the Minister of Fisheries & Communities for the Province of Prince Edward Island.

Prior to his election to the legislature, Fox was a Chief of Police and a businessman in Prince Edward Island and New Brunswick.

Fox also became involved with Imperial Oil and designed, constructed and operated Esso retail and commercial sites in Prince Edward Island and New Brunswick from 1998 to 2012.

Electoral record

References

Living people
Members of the Executive Council of Prince Edward Island
People from Prince County, Prince Edward Island
People from Woodstock, New Brunswick
Progressive Conservative Party of Prince Edward Island MLAs
21st-century Canadian politicians
Canadian police chiefs
1964 births